Bazm may refer to:
 Bazm, Fars
 Bazm, Isfahan